Peckoltichthys bachi is a species of armored catfish and the only member of its genus. This species is found throughout the upper Amazon River and its tributaries in Brazil, Colombia, Ecuador, and Peru. The species reaches 14 cm (5.5 inches) SL. FishBase lists this species as a member of Peckoltia.

References

Ancistrini
Fish of Brazil
Freshwater fish of Colombia
Freshwater fish of Ecuador
Freshwater fish of Peru